Cockburnspath railway station served the village of Cockburnspath, Berwickshire, Scotland from 1846 to 1951 on the East Coast Main Line.

History 
The station opened on 22 June 1846 by the North British Railway. The station building was one-storey and was on a H plan. The station closed on 18 June 1951.

References

External links 

Disused railway stations in the Scottish Borders
Former North British Railway stations
Railway stations in Great Britain opened in 1846
Railway stations in Great Britain closed in 1951
1846 establishments in Scotland
1951 disestablishments in Scotland